St Germans or St German's may refer to:

 St Germans, Cornwall, England
 St Germans railway station
 St German's Priory
 St Germans River
 St Germans Rural District, a local government division 1894–1974
 St Germans (UK Parliament constituency) 1562–1832
 St German's Church, in Cardiff, Wales
 Bishop of St Germans, an episcopal title in England
 Earl of St Germans, a title in the Peerage of the United Kingdom

See also

 Saint-Germain (disambiguation)
 Peel Cathedral, the Cathedral Church of Saint German, Isle of Man
 Wiggenhall St Germans, in Norfolk, England